The Fussball Club Basel 1893 1986–87 season was their 93rd season since the club's foundation. It was their 41st consecutive season in the top flight of Swiss football since they achieved promotion in the 1945–46 season. FC Basel played their home games in the St. Jakob Stadium. Peter Max Sutter was the club's newly appointed chairman.

Overview

Pre-season
Helmut Benthaus had returned first team manager the season before, this was his second consecutive season as coach. There were a number of changes in the team. The defenders Ertan Irizik moved on to St. Gallen, Francois Laydu moved on to Locarno, Stefano Ceccaroni moved to FC Laufen and Alfred Lüthi moved on to Grenchen. Further the midfielder Martin Jeitziner moved on to Young Boys, and the two forwards Beat Sutter moved on to Xamax and Ruedi Zbinden moved on to Grenchen. In the other direction, Stefan Bützer who had won the championship with the Young Boys the previous season signed in for the club. Then Jean-Pierre François and Markus Füri both signed in from local team Concordia Basel and Markus Hodel signed in from local club Nordstern Basel. Further Bruno Hänni joined from lower tier club FC Oensingen and as reserve goalkeeper Patrick Mäder joined from lower tier club Schaffhausen.

In this season Basel played a total of 52 games. 30 matches were played in the domestic league and then another four in the promotion/relegation play-offs, three games were in the Swiss Cup and 15 were friendly matches. Of their test games, nine ended with a victory, four were drawn and two ended with a defeat. During these games the team scored 42 goals and conceded 18. All the test games were played away from home.

Domestic league
The aim of the Swiss Football Association (SFV) in the season 1986–87 the Nationalliga A was to reduce the number of clubs in the top flight of Swiss football from 16 to just 12. At the end of the season the top 10 clubs were to remain in the top division and the 15th and 16th club to be relegated directly to the Nationalliga B. Four teams from the Nationalliga A (in positions 11 to the 14) and four teams from the Nationalliga B (the 3rd to 6th positioned teams) contested a play-off round to determine the last two places in next season's Nationalliga A. Basel's announced aim was to defend their position in the top flight of Swiss football during the main season and to achieve a position above a play-off positions. 

Basel played a mediocre season, although they won only two of their first ten games, they were always placed in the middle of the table and kept this position after the winter break with three wins against lower placed teams. But then with seven defeats in the last ten games meant that they slipped in the table. Basel ended the main season with only 24 points in 12th position and so had to enter into this knock-out round. Here they were drawn against Bulle (3rd in the Nationallaiga B) in a two-legged promotion/relegation play-off semi-final. Both games ended with a two all draw, but decisively Basel defeated Bulle 5–3 on penalties. Basel then defeated FC Wettingen 8–2 on aggregate (1–2 and 7–0) in one of the two promotion/relegation finals and managed to save their slot in the highest tier of Swiss football. The team completed their aim, but the play-off round was an undesirable addition to the season. Xamax won the championship winning 48 points and qualified for the 1987–88 European Cup. Grasshopper Club and Sion ended second and third and thus qualified for the 1987–88 UEFA Cup.

Swiss Cup
In the Swiss Cup Basel entered in the round of 64 with an away game against Nationalliga B team FC Köniz and Basel won 9–2. They continued to the round of 32 in which they had a home game against third tier Fribourg and this was won 3–1. The cup season came to an end in the round of 16 as Basel lost the home game against lower classed Kriens. Young Boys and Servette advanced to the final, which was traditionally always played in the Wankdorf Stadium in Bern. After 90 minutes the game ended 1–1, but YB won the trophy 4–2 after extra time und thus qualified for the 1987–88 Cup Winners' Cup.

Players 

 
 

 

  

 

 
 
 

 

Players who left the squad

Results 
Legend

Friendly matches

Pre- and mid-season

Winter break

Nationalliga A

League matches

League table

Nationalliga A/B: Play-outs 
Semi-final 

Basel advance to final, Bulle remain in Nationalliga B

Final 

Aggregate 8–2, Basel remain in Nationalliga A, Wettingen relegated

Swiss Cup

See also
 History of FC Basel
 List of FC Basel players
 List of FC Basel seasons

References

Sources
 Rotblau: Jahrbuch Saison 2015/2016. Publisher: FC Basel Marketing AG. 
 Die ersten 125 Jahre. Publisher: Josef Zindel im Friedrich Reinhardt Verlag, Basel. 
 The FCB squad 1986–87 at fcb-archiv.ch
 1986–87 at RSSSF

External links
 FC Basel official site

FC Basel seasons
Basel